Caprino may refer to:

 Caprino cheese, a type of Italian goat cheeses

In places:
 Caprino Bergamasco, a municipality in the Italian region of Lombardy
 Caprino Veronese, a municipality in the Italian region Veneto
 Caprino, Switzerland, a quarter of the city Lugano

In persons:
 Ivo Caprino (1920–2001), Norwegian film director